Śnieżne Kotły (literally Snowy Pits, Snowy Cirque, Snowy Cwm) are two glacial cirques situated in Poland in the Sudetes in the Karkonosze National Park. They are a unique example of the alpine landscape in the area and have been a nature reserve since 1933.

Description 
They were formed during the last phase of the glacial period and consist predominantly of granite. However, in two exposed places basalt was found (apparently of volcanic origin), which is quite rare in this part of Central Europe. Some rare species of arctic and alpine plants appear in the cold and dark parts of the cirques: Pulsatilla alpina, Gentiana asclepiadea, Aconitum napellus, and the only place in the Sudetes where Micranthes nivalis appears. At the top of the larger cirque, at the Łabski Szczyt, there is a radio and television tower.

Hiking and climbing 
It is possible to climb the cirque walls, though climbing is permitted only in January and February and dangerous; since World War II there have been ten fatal accidents.

Hiking is possible: the Polish - Czech Friendship Trail, part of the Main Sudeten Trail, runs along the upper ridge of the cirques, close to the abyss. Also, a yellow trail from the mountain hut under the Łabski Peak (Polish: Schronisko pod Łabskim Szczytem) leads to the top of the cirques. The green trail leads through the bottom of the cirques.

References 

Sudetes
Valleys of Poland